Magnolia insignis (syn. Manglietia insignis), the red lotus tree, is a species of flowering plant in the family Magnoliaceae, native to Nepal, Assam, Tibet, southern China, Myanmar, Thailand and Vietnam. It is used as a street tree in a number of southern Chinese cities.

References

insignis
Flora of Nepal
Flora of Assam (region)
Flora of Tibet
Flora of South-Central China
Flora of Southeast China
Flora of Myanmar
Flora of Thailand
Flora of Vietnam
Plants described in 1824